Holoholo is a Bantu language of DR Congo and formerly in Tanzania spoken by the Holoholo people on either side of Lake Tanganyika. Classification is uncertain, but it may belong with the Takama group (Nurse 2003:169).

Maho (2009) classifies D281 Tumbwe (Etumbwe) and D282 Lumbwe as closest to Holoholo. Neither has an ISO code.

References

 

L
Northeast Bantu languages
Languages of the Democratic Republic of the Congo
Languages of Tanzania